Orne Islands is a group of small islands lying close north of Ronge Island, off the west coast of Graham Land. First roughly surveyed in 1898 by the Belgian Antarctic Expedition under Gerlache. The name Orne Islands was probably in use by Norwegian whalers, because it was used by Scottish geologist David Ferguson following his geological reconnaissance of this area aboard the Hanka in 1913.

See also 
 List of Antarctic and sub-Antarctic islands

Islands of Graham Land
Danco Coast